Muhamed Zulfić (born 13 May 1992) is a Bosnian handball player who plays for Dinamo București and the Bosnia and Herzegovina national team.

References

1992 births
Living people
Bosnia and Herzegovina male handball players
Sportspeople from Sarajevo
Bosnia and Herzegovina expatriate sportspeople in Romania